The 2017 TCR International Series Dubai round was the tenth and final round of the 2017 TCR International Series season. It took place on 18 November at the Dubai Autodrome.

Pepe Oriola won the first race starting from fourth, driving a SEAT León TCR, while Stefano Comini gained the second one starting from second, driving an Audi RS3 LMS TCR. 

Jean-Karl Vernay won the Drivers championship, after out scoring main rival Attila Tassi in Race 1. Tassi then defended the runner-up spot in the championship from Stefano Comini, finishing just 1 point ahead of Comini, following Race 2. M1RA won the Teams championship, while the Volkswagen Golf GTI TCR secured the Model of the Year championship, in the second race.

Ballast
Due to the results obtained in the previous round, Robert Huff received +30 kg, Gianni Morbidelli received +20 kg and both Jean-Karl Vernay and Gabriele Tarquini received +10 kg. However, since Robert Huff didn't take part in the event, he didn't take the ballast.

Classification

Qualifying

Notes
 — Gabriele Tarquini and Alain Menu, who had qualified second and fourth in Q1. Was not allowed to take part in Q2, because their Hyundai i30 N TCRs were running on a temporary homologation, which means that they are not eligible for points.
 — Gabriele Tarquini was sent to the back of the grid for Race 1, after an engine change.

Race 1

Notes
 — Maťo Homola was given a post race 30 second time penalty for causing a collision and rejoining the track unsafely during the race.

Race 2

Notes
 — Alain Menu and Aurélien Comte was sent to the back of the grid for Race 2, after having broken the parc fermé regulations following Race 1.

Standings after the event

Drivers' Championship standings

Model of the Year standings

Teams' Championship standings

 Note: Only the top five positions are included for both sets of drivers' standings.

References

External links
TCR International Series official website

Dubai
TCR International Series